Zelenkoa is a genus of flowering plants from the orchid family, Orchidaceae. It contains only one known species, Zelenkoa onusta, native to Ecuador and Peru.

Zelenkoa onusta is an epiphytic desert orchid, that survives in the harsh conditions of dry forests in southwestern Ecuador and northwestern Peru between sea level and 1200 meters, growing on trees and cacti. Flowers are 2.cm wide.

See also 
 List of Orchidaceae genera

References

External links 

IOSPE orchid photos, Oncidium onustum Lindley 1833 Photo courtesy of Jay Pfahl
Video by Jerry Fischer video explaining biology + ecology of Zelenkoa onusta

Monotypic Epidendroideae genera
Oncidiinae genera
Oncidiinae
Orchids of Panama
Orchids of South America
Flora of Peru